Trooper Hook is a 1957 American Western film directed by Charles Marquis Warren and starring Joel McCrea as the title character and Barbara Stanwyck as the woman he frees from the Indians. The fact that during her captivity she has had a son by a much-feared chief makes her situation very difficult.

Plot
Apache Chief Nanchez orders the massacre of a US cavalry troop surrounded by his warriors. Cavalry reinforcements arrive, and Sgt. Clovis Hook takes Nanchez and most of his men captive, though a few escape. The soldiers then torch the Apache village, rounding up the women and children. A soldier spots a white woman. The woman possessively clutches a small child named Quito. She is Cora Sutcliff, taken captive in a raid some years before while travelling to join her rancher husband, and she is the mother of Nanchez’s son.

When they reach the fort, the general feeling is unsympathetic toward the woman, the reasoning being that any sane white woman in her shoes would have killed herself before allowing herself to be "defiled" by an Indian. The commanding officer's wife alone expresses sympathy, feeling that she may have done what Cora did to survive.

Hook is assigned to escort Cora and her son to her husband. The next day, Cora and Quito wait for him at the general store. A man insults Quito and Cora and grabs Quito. Cora hits the bully with a shovel, threatening to kill any man who lays hands on her son, the first words she has spoken. Hook arrives and they set off on a stagecoach driven by Mr. Trude.

At a stop, Cora and Quito are barred from Wilson’s restaurant by its owner, so Hook buys cheese sandwiches and they have a picnic. Cora asks him if he can understand wanting to live so much that you will put up with any humiliation. Hook reveals that as a prisoner of war in the Confederate prison at Andersonville, he pretended to be a dog for a month so that a dog-loving prisoner, who was dying and hallucinating with fever, would share his rations with him.

Meanwhile, Nanchez escapes, rounds up his remaining braves, and sets out to take back his son.

The stagecoach picks up and drops off other passengers, including a young cowboy, Jeff Bennett, whom everyone calls simply “Cowboy.” Cowboy is courteous toward Cora and Quito, before getting off at San Miguel. Next, the stagecoach takes on an aristocratic elderly Spanish woman, Senora Sandoval, and her granddaughter, Consuela (sic), who has left her convent school for an arranged marriage. Rancher Charlie Travers, boards, carrying a large sum of money he has won in a poker game. Back in San Miguel, Cowboy learns that Nanchez has escaped and is likely after his son. Cowboy sets out on horseback to catch up with the stagecoach.

Cowboy manages to slip past Nanchez’s men and warns Hook. Hook tells his fellow passengers why Nanchez is stalking them. All but Travers support Cora’s decision to keep Quito. As Trude drives the stagecoach at a break-neck pace, it hits a rock, overturns, and breaks a wheel. They are forced to spend the night while Trude makes repairs. Cowboy and Consuela get acquainted, and an attraction develops between them.

In the morning, Nanchez sends word that he will attack unless his son is returned to him. Travers offers Cora money to give up Quito. When Cora remains undeterred, Travers sneaks off to try to bribe Nanchez to spare the group. Nanchez kills him, leaving his money untouched. Surrounded, Hook has Trude restrain Cora and makes Cowboy hold a gun to Quito’s head within full sight of Nanchez, instructing him to shoot if Hook drops his arm as a signal during his parley with Nanchez. Hook tells Natchez that his son’s life will be forfeit if he attacks. Thwarted, Nanchez orders a retreat.

The stagecoach reaches their destination, but Cora’s husband Fred is not there to meet her. Hook rents a buckboard to take them to Fred's ranch. When they arrive, Fred makes it clear he is willing to take Cora back, but not her son. Cora decides to leave with Quito. Fred points a rifle at Hook, affirming that Cora belongs to him, but that he and Quito can leave. Then Nanchez and his band appear.

A chase ensues. Hook drives a buckboard hellbent for election, while Fred rides in the back, firing his rifle at the pursuing Apaches. Fred kills Nanchez, but is himself shot and killed. Seeing Nanchez fall, the Apaches give up the chase and leave. Hook stops long enough to bury Fred by the road.
 
Heading back to the fort, Hook tells Cora that his enlistment is up in four months, if she will have him. He then slips his arm around her, and they ride off into the sunset with Quito.

Cast

Joel McCrea as Sgt. Clovis Hook
Barbara Stanwyck as Cora Sutliff
Earl Holliman as Jeff Bennett
Edward Andrews as Charlie Travers
John Dehner as Fred Sutliff
Susan Kohner as Consuela
Royal Dano as Mr. Trude
Celia Lovsky as Señora Sandoval
Stanley Adams as Heathcliff
Terry Lawrence as Quito
Rodolfo Acosta as Nanchez (as Rudolfo Acosta)
Richard Shannon as Trooper Ryan
Sheb Wooley as Townsman
Jeanne Bates as Weaver's daughter
Patrick O'Moore as Col. Adam Weaver
Cyril Delevanti as Junius
Rush Williams as Cpl. Stoner
Alfred Linder 
Paul Newlan as Mr. Wilson
Dee J. Thompson as Tess (as D. J. Thompson)
Mary Gregory
Charles Gray as Soldier

Production
Parts of the film were shot in Kanab Canyon, Three Lakes and the Gap in Utah.

References

External links

1957 films
1957 Western (genre) films
American Western (genre) films
Western (genre) cavalry films
Apache Wars films
Films shot in Utah
American black-and-white films
Films directed by Charles Marquis Warren
United Artists films
1950s English-language films
1950s American films